This is a list of NCAA Division I men's basketball tournament all-time records, updated through the first round of the  2022 tournament. Schools whose names are italicized are no longer in Division I, and can no longer be included in the tournament. Teams with (*) have had games vacated due to NCAA rules violations. The records do include vacated games.

*Team vacating NCAA Tournament action
Last updated after 2019 tournament

References

Team Records
College men's basketball records and statistics in the United States
College basketball in the United States lists